Timothy Masters may refer to:

 Timothy Lee Masters, convicted and then exonerated in the Peggy Hettrick murder case
 Timothy Masters (rower) (born 1992), Australian rower